Last Day of June is an adventure puzzle video game developed by Ovosonico and published by 505 Games. It is based on Steven Wilson's song Drive Home. The game was released for PlayStation 4 and Windows in August 2017.

Plot
Last Day of June is centred around a couple called Carl and June, who suffer a tragedy when a car accident kills June and leaves Carl in a wheelchair. One day, Carl touches one of June's paintings of people who had been present on the day of the accident and discovers that he can revisit their memories. As Carl relives their memories, the characters can perform actions that change the sequence of events that led up to June's death.

Carl manages to prevent the initial accident, but another event causes the car crash. He continues to change events multiple times, but each attempt still results in the accident by different circumstances. In the finale of the game, Carl realizes that he cannot change that someone dies that day, so he switches places with June, sacrificing himself instead, saving her and their unborn child. Shortly before the end of the game, Carl finds a sketchbook made by June which lists attempts by her to save him, rather than the other way around. Nate Hohl of All Gamers proposes instead that wheelchair-using Carl is June's fantasy and manifestation of grief, while the game's final revelation is her recovery.

Gameplay
Last Day of June is an adventure puzzle video game in third-person perspective. The player initially controls Carl who is on a date with June on the day leading up to their accident. Afterwards, the player controls Carl in their home at a later date and discovers that they can interact with June's paintings. This allows the player to take control of various characters from the day of the accident in an attempt to solve puzzles to alter the sequence of events that indirectly caused the accident. As the player fails to prevent June's death, new paintings and characters are unlocked to allow for an increasingly complex sequence of changes.

Score

Songs based on:

Development and release
Last Day of June was developed by Italian studio Ovosonico and published by 505 Games. The game was directed by Massimo Guarini. Guarini based Last Day of June on the song "Drive Home" by British musician Steven Wilson. Wilson himself was involved in composing music for the game.

The game was announced in May 2017. It was released for PlayStation 4 and Windows on 31 August 2017.

Reception

Last Day of June was received favourably by critics. Eurogamer ranked it 33rd on their list of the "Top 50 Games of 2017", while Polygon ranked it 38th on their list of the 50 best games of 2017. In Adventure Gamers Aggie Awards 2017, it won the award for "Best Story", while it was a runner-up each for "Best Concept", "Best Graphic Design", and "Best Non-Traditional Adventure". It was nominated for "Game Beyond Entertainment" at the 14th British Academy Games Awards.

References

External links
 

2017 video games
505 Games games
Adventure games
Nintendo Switch games
PlayStation 4 games
Puzzle video games
Single-player video games
Video games about death
Video games about mental health
Video games developed in Italy
Windows games
Avantgarden games